Touch the Sky may refer to:

Film and television
Touch the Sky, a 2012 documentary starring Guy Laliberté

Music

Albums
Touch the Sky (ATC album), 2003
Touch the Sky (Carole King album), 1979
Touch the Sky (Smokey Robinson album), 1983
Touch the Sky EP, an EP by Radical Face

Songs
"Touch the Sky" (Cartouche song), 1994
"Touch the Sky" (Hostyle Gospel song), 2012
"Touch the Sky" (Julie Fowlis song), 2012
"Touch the Sky" (Kanye West song), 2006
"Touch the Sky" (Sean Paul song), 2012
"Touch the Sky", a song by Cedric Gervais featuring Digital Farm Animals and Dallas Austin, 2017
"Touch the Sky", a song by Hillsong United from the 2015 album Empires
"Touch the Sky", a song by Julian Lennon from the 2011 album Everything Changes
"Touch the Sky", a song by Smokey Robinson from the 1983 album of the same name
"Touch the Sky", a 2018 song by NEFFEX

See also
Let's Touch the Sky, 2010 album of the jazz group Fourplay
Reach Up and Touch the Sky, 1981 double live album by Southside Johnny & The Asbury Jukes